Bhaukaal  is a 2020 Hindi-language crime drama web series directed by Jatin Wagle for MX Player. It is produced by Sameer Nair, Deepak Segal, Pammi Baweja & Harman Baweja and Vicky Bahri under Applause Entertainment & Baweja Movies Production.

The series stars Mohit Raina, Abhimanyu Singh, Siddhanth Kapoor, Bidita Bag, and Pradeep Nagar in key roles.

Plot
Naveen Sikhera (Mohit Raina) promoted to Senior Superintendent of Police (SSP) and is transferred to the city. Sikhera's transfer is a punishment more than a promotion. The city is ruled by two gangs Shaukeen gang in the east and the Dedha brothers rule the west. The two gangs have divided up turf to carry on with their businesses. These two gangs' terror is on the peak, such that even the local police never dare to question them. IPS officer Naveen Sikhera makes his own way to clean the city as the new SSP.

Cast
Mohit Raina as SSP Naveen Sikhera IPS
Abhimanyu Singh as Shaukeen
Upen Chauhan as Constable Rajesh Yadav
Gulki Joshi as Neha, Journalist
Bidita Bag as Nazneen
Siddhanth Kapoor as Chintu Dedha 
Pradeep Nagar as Pintu Dedha
Shahab Khan as Dayanad Sikhera, Navin's Father
Rahul Baisla as Gurjan
Sunny Hinduja as Farukh Qureshi
Rashmi Rajput as Puja Sikhera
Sanyam Srivastav as Karim

Vibhu mogha as fan

References

External links

Indian drama web series
MX Player original programming